Zafarullah Mirza is a Pakistani politician who served as a Special Assistant to the Prime Minister for Health. He was appointed by Prime Minister Imran Khan on 23 April 2019.
 
Before this, he was leading the Public Health, Innovation and Intellectual Property team at WHO headquarters in Geneva, Switzerland, for six years.

Career 
Zafar Mirza has served as the Director of Healthcare System Development at the WHO Regional Office for the Eastern Mediterranean. He is a medical doctor with post-graduation in Public Health in Developing Countries from London School of Hygiene and Tropical Medicine and a clinical stint in mental health. He also served as a Regional Adviser for Essential Medicines and Pharmaceutical Policies in the WHO Regional Office for 7 years prior to moving to WHO headquarters. For 12 years before joining WHO, he was a founder Executive Director of a civil society organization – The Network for Consumer Protection in Pakistan.

He has a long standing experience of working at national, regional and global levels in public and private health sectors. He has extensively travelled, published and contributed to improving public health in many countries.

On 6 July 2020, Mirza tested positive for COVID-19.

On 29 July 2020, Mirza announced that he was resigning from his post as Special Assistant to Prime Minister on Health. The resignation was subsequently accepted by the prime minister.

References

Living people
21st-century Pakistani politicians
Imran Khan administration
Year of birth missing (living people)
Pakistani public health doctors
Pakistan Tehreek-e-Insaf politicians